George London (c. 1640–1714) was an English nurseryman and garden designer. He aspired to the baroque style and was a founding partner in the Brompton Park Nursery in 1681. Henry Wise (1653–1738) was his apprentice, and the two later worked as partners on parterre gardens at Hampton Court (where they designed Hampton Court Maze), Chelsea Hospital, Longleat, Chatsworth, Melbourne Hall, Wimpole Hall and Castle Howard.

His garden designs at Hanbury Hall near Bromsgrove have been re-instated using plans, contemporary surveys and archaeological evidence.

George London's birth date is not certain but it was probably about 1640.
His black grave slab is inside All Saints Church, Fulham, where he is buried with his wife Elizabeth. George was gardener to Henry Compton at Fulham Palace, Fulham.

References

 

1640s births
Year of birth unknown
1714 deaths
English landscape architects
English businesspeople
18th-century English people
Nurserymen